In the category of the members of the College of Cardinals in the central Middle Ages (11th to 13th century), an external cardinal (as opposed to a "curial cardinal") was a Cardinal of the Holy Roman Church who did not reside in the Roman Curia, because of simultaneously being a bishop of the episcopal see other than suburbicarian, or abbot of an abbey situated outside Rome. In the wider sense, it may also concern cardinals who were appointed to the external episcopal sees and resigned their memberships in the College of Cardinals with this appointment. As well, it can concern cardinals who were generally curial cardinals, but for some time exercised the posts of administrators or prelates of the external churches.

Today, the great majority of the cardinals are archbishops of the main metropolitan dioceses of the world and reside in their countries. Apart from the exclusive right of the election of the new pope, their dignity is purely honorific. However, originally the College of Cardinals was simply a college of the clergy of the City of Rome, constituted of the bishops of the seven dioceses (called suburbicarian sees) bordering the diocese of Rome (cardinal-bishops), priests of the parochial churches of Rome (cardinal-priests) and deacons heading the ecclesiastical regions of the city of Rome (cardinal-deacons). Unlike today, the cardinals had real jurisdiction over the dioceses, parochial churches (called tituli) or deaconries to which they were attached. The phenomenon of the external cardinalate in the late Middle Ages constituted the first exception to the rule, that cardinals – members of the clergy of the diocese of Rome – cannot serve simultaneously in another, external church, which is now common practice.

History

Origins and development 

The College of Cardinals originated from the college of the main clergy of the city of Rome. The title of cardinal initially concerned only the priests of the 28 parochial churches of the Eternal City (tituli), who were required to assist the pope in the liturgical service in the four Basilicas of Rome (Vatican Basilica, Liberian Basilica, Basilica of St. Paul Outside the Walls and San Lorenzo fuori le Mura). Later (probably in the 8th century) the term was extended to the bishops of the seven dioceses bordering the diocese of Rome: Ostia, Porto, Albano, Palestrina, Silva Candida (1079 replaced by Segni), Gabii-Lavicum (whose name later changed to Tusculum, and later to Frascati) and Velletri (after 1060 replaced by Sabina). These bishops (cardinal-bishops) performed the liturgical service in the Lateran Basilica. Finally, the deacons serving in the papal household or heading the ecclesiastical regions of the city (and later attached to the churches called deaconries), also became the cardinals (cardinal-deacons).

The cardinals of the Holy Roman Church up to the 11th century had strictly liturgical duties and generally took no part in the government of the Church. Cardinal bishops were equal to the other bishops, even if celebrating the rite of consecration of the new pope gave them considerable prestige, while the dignity of the cardinal priest or deacon was considered lower than that of a bishop. The liturgical service in the five patriarchal basilicas of Rome, as well as day pastoral duties in constant presence of the cardinals at Rome.

This situation started to gradually change with the ascension of Pope Leo IX (1049–1054) and the beginning of the Reform Papacy. This pope, in order to reform the corrupted Roman clergy, appointed several new cardinals from the monastic centers outside Rome, such as Monte Cassino, Remiremont and Cluny. These new cardinals became his close advisors. Leo's successors continued this trend and Nicholas II in 1059 gave the cardinals the exclusive right to elect a new pope. At the end of the 11th century the boca formed a single College of Cardinals, which became the main body of the papal government — they served as experts or judges in the legal causes (auditors), countersigned the solemn papal privileges, acted as governors of the cities or provinces of the Papal States or were sent by the popes on important diplomatic missions. The cardinals became the most important members of the Roman Curia, and as such were still required to reside in the papal court, unless they were dispatched for a legatine mission in the name of the pope.

Almost simultaneously to the development of the College of Cardinals as a body of papal advisors, the popes started to elevate to the cardinalate some "external" abbots. After such appointments, they continued to reside in their abbeys and did not become members of the Papal curia. On the other hands, the elections of the cardinals to the posts of abbots of external monasteries were also ratified by the popes. The main goal of such appointments was probably to strengthen the ties between some important monastic centers with the Roman Church. The first known instances of such appointments concerned the abbey of Montecassino, one of the main centers supporting reform of the Church. In 1057 cardinal-deacon Frederick de Lorraine (the future pope Stephen X) was elected abbot of Montecassino; Pope Victor II confirmed his election and simultaneously named him cardinal-priest of S. Crisogono. His successor as abbot of Montecassino, Desiderio, was also quickly promoted to the cardinalate, but continued to act also as abbot. From 1057 until 1259/62 at least eight abbots of Montecassino were simultaneously members of the College of Cardinals. Also some other Italian (e.g. Subiaco, Farfa, Vallombrosa, S. Sophia in Benevento) and French abbeys (St Victor at Marseille) were for some time ruled by the cardinal-abbots.

During the Investiture Controversy, both the legitimate Popes as well as Antipope Clement III developed another, not entirely new, practice. They appointed their cardinals to the important Episcopal sees in Italy in order to assure their government by their own trusted collaborators. Antipope Clement III named cardinals Hugo Candidus and Roberto of S. Marco bishops of Fermo and Faenza respectively. Popes Victor III and Urban II appointed their cardinals to the episcopal sees of Brescia (Herimanus) and Reggio-Emilia (Bonussenior). The practice was continued by successive popes, who named their cardinals particularly to the recently reestablished Latin archiepiscopal sees in southern Italy (Siponto, Brindisi, Salerno, Benevento). Also, three successive archbishops of Pisa: Uberto Rossi Lanfranchi (1133–1137/38), Balduino (1138–1145) and Villano Caetani (1146–1175) were initially the cardinals.

Up to the pontificate of Pope Alexander III (1159–1181), all the cardinals who were appointed to the external episcopal sees, resigned their membership in the College of Cardinals after receiving episcopal consecration, which clearly shows that the episcopate was considered a higher dignity than that of cardinal-priest or deacon. On the other hand, the bishops were never appointed cardinals. Certainly, the episcopate and cardinalate were considered incompatible dignities. However, during Alexander's pontificate a change is apparent; although there were still the cases of the cardinals leaving the College of Cardinals after assuming episcopal office (Lombardo of Benevento, Rainaldo of Gaeta), there also appeared members of the College who were simultaneously cardinals and bishops. Perhaps Alexander III followed here an example of his rival, Antipope Victor IV, who in 1162 appointed Aicardo Cornazzano bishop of Parma and cardinal-priest. The first such instance in the legitimate obedience was Conrad of Wittelsbach, who was appointed cardinal-priest of S. Marcello in December 1165 and subsequently promoted to the suburbicarian see of Sabina, but continued to act also as archbishop of Mainz. Archbishop of Reims Guillaume aux Blanches Mains was named cardinal priest of S. Sabina in 1179, but retained archdiocese of Reims; similarly bishops Giovanni of Toscanella, Ruffino of Rimini and Gerardo of Novara, elevated to the cardinalate in 1189, 1190 and 1211 respectively. On the other hand, when cardinal-priest Uberto Crivelli was elected and consecrated archbishop of Milan in 1185, he retained his cardinalate and his Roman titulus (S. Lorenzo in Damaso). The posts of cardinal and bishop were no longer considered incompatible with each other. Moreover, the rank of cardinal-priest or cardinal-deacon became equal to that of bishop. However, it seems that the elected, but not yet consecrated, bishops who were appointed cardinals were generally obliged to resign their sees.

Further development occurred in the pontificate of Clement III (1187–1191). Cardinals elected to the external sees renounced their titular churches but without resigning their membership in the College of Cardinals. They used the title cardinalis Sanctae Romanae Ecclesiae in addition to the episcopal title, without indicating their cardinalitial order or titular church. The first such case was that of Adelardo Cattaneo, cardinal-priest of S. Marcello from 1185 and bishop of Verona 1188–1214. That he resigned the church of San Marcello appears not only from his titulature in the documents, but also from the fact that during his lifetime a new cardinal-priest of this title (Fidanzio) was appointed. The case of Adelardo was followed by the cardinal-archbishops Guy Paré of Reims (1204), Uberto Pirovano of Milan (1207) and Stephen Langton of Canterbury (1207) under Pope Innocent III. At the end of 12th century ca. 15% of the members of the College of Cardinals were "external" cardinals.

End of the medieval "external" cardinalate 

Despite the cases mentioned above, the pontificate of Innocent III marks also the beginning of the end of the "external" cardinalate. Stephen Langton was the last cardinal allowed by the Pope to become a diocesan bishop of the external see. From that time the popes constantly rejected all such postulations made by the cathedral chapters, indicating that the presence of the cardinals in the papal curia is indispensable. On the other hand, bishops appointed to the College of Cardinals were obliged to resign their sees (although it must be remarked that until the end of the 13th century they were appointed always to the rank of cardinal-bishop). It is still possible to find a few cases of the cardinals who exercised the posts of administrators of the episcopal sees, but only for a short time, often as part of their legatine duties. The last instance of external cardinal sensu stricto was abbot Riccardo of Montecassino (1252–1259/62). Generally already in the pontificate of Gregory IX (1227–1241), the College of Cardinals became an exclusively curial body, without any "external" element, and remained such until the Great Western Schism (1378–1417). However, during this time the rank of cardinal became also the highest in the Catholic Church, inferior only to the Pope.

The phenomenon of the "external" cardinalate was revived during the Great Western Schism, but in another form and for other reasons. Popes from the rival obediences gave the cardinalitial dignities to the churchmen serving European monarchs (Crown-cardinals) without calling them to the Roman Curia, in order to assure the support of the monarchs. These cardinals continued to reside in their countries. Additionally, the curial cardinals in 13th century started to cumulate a great number of the benefices, from the time of the Schism including also the episcopal sees. After the Council of Trent (1545–1563), the cardinals occupying external bishoprics were generally obliged to reside in them. Today, the majority of the cardinals are simultaneously diocesan archbishops or bishops, and they have no real jurisdiction over their titular churches at Rome.

Titulature and engagement in the papal government 

There was no consistency to the titulature used by the "external" cardinals in the official documents issued by the popes, secular rulers or by themselves. Cardinal-abbots subscribed or were called sometimes only as cardinals, sometimes only as abbots, and sometimes using both titles. Abbot Mainardo of Pomposa subscribed papal bulls only as cardinal-bishop of Silva Candida. Desiderius of Montecassino subscribed papal bulls as abbot and cardinal or only as cardinal, while the papal privileges for the abbey Montecassino call him either cardinal and abbot or only abbot. Abbot Richard of St.-Victor used the forms “cardinal and abbot” or only abbot. Leonato of S. Clemente in Casauria in the private documents subscribed as cardinal and abbot but the papal privileges issued for him call him only abbot without indicating his cardinalate.

Cardinals who simultaneously were also bishops usually appear in the documents with both titles: cardinalitial and episcopal. The only exceptions are archbishop Uberto Crivelli of Milan, who subscribed papal bulls only as cardinal, and Ruggiero of Benevento, who generally was styled only as archbishop, while his cardinalate was mentioned very infrequently.

Even more differentiated was the engagement of the "external" cardinals in the Church government and the papal policy, even if limited evidence does not fully highlight this question. Certainly some of them spent some time working in the papal curia, which is attested by their subscriptions on the papal bulls. Among the signatories of the papal privileges appear abbots Desiderius of Montecassino, Mainardo of Pomposa, Giovanni of Subiaco, Richard of St.-Victor, Oderisio de Marsi of Montecassino, Bernardo degli Uberti of Vallombrosa, Amico of S. Vincenzo, Adenulf of Farfa, Benedetto of Torre Maggiore and Giovanni of S. Sophia, as well as the bishops Hugo Candidus, Konrad von Wittelsbach, Guillaume of Reims, Uberto Crivelli of Milan, Giovanni of Toscanella and Ruffino of Rimini. The last three seem to have been de facto curial cardinals, having spent at the papal court most of their time. On the other hand, cardinals like Pietro of S. Benedetto in Salerno, Rainaldo of Montecassino, Simone of Subiaco, Leonato of S. Clemente in Casauria, Ruggiero of Benevento, Roffredo of Montecassino or Riccardo of Montecassino seem to have never participated in the curial business. Also cardinals Adelardo Cattaneo of Verona, Guy Paré of Reims, Uberto Pirovano of Milan and Stephen Langton of Canterbury after their episcopal appointments are no longer attested in the papal curia.

Several "external" cardinals acted as papal legates or vicars, often in the region of their episcopal seat or abbey. Among them were: 
 Peter Igneus of S. Salvatore – legate in Germany (1079) and France (1080), 
 Mainardo of Pomposa – legate before Emperor Henry IV (1065) and in Milan (1067)
 Richard of St.-Victor – legate in Spain for many years
 Konrad von Wittelsbach – legate in Germany from 1177
 Guillaume of Reims – legate in France from 1179
 Ruffino of Rimini – legate in Imola (ca.1191)
 Gerardo de Sessio – legate in Lombardy (1210–11)

Besides, some "external" cardinals participated in the papal elections: Desiderius of Montecassino and Richard of St.-Victor in 1086, Oderisio de Marsi in 1088, Enrico of Mazara and Amico of S. Vincenzo in 1118, Simone Borelli in 1159, Uberto Crivelli in 1185, probably also Konrad von Wittelsbach in 1185, Giovanni of Toscanella in 1191 and 1198, and Ruffino of Rimini in 1191.

Three "external" cardinals became popes: Frederick of Montecassino became Pope Stephen IX in 1057, Desiderius of Montecassino became Pope Victor III in 1086 and Uberto Crivelli of Milan became Pope Urban III in 1185.

Lists of the "external" cardinals 

Note: The "external" cardinals have been divided into four subcategories, of whom only the first two concern the "external" cardinals sensu stricto. Some cardinals belonged to more than one subcategory. The disputed cases are listed separately at the end of the each subsection. Cardinals created by antipopes ("pseudocardinals") are also included.

Cardinal-abbots 

The list is arranged chronologically by the date of appointment of the abbot to the cardinalate or of the cardinal to the abbacy.

Disputed cases

Cardinals – diocesan bishops (11–13th century) 

The list is arranged chronologically by the date of appointment of the bishop to the cardinalate or of the cardinal to the episcopate.

Disputed case

Cardinals who renounced their cardinalate after appointments to the external bishoprics 

The list is arranged chronologically by the date of appointment of the cardinal to the external episcopal see and his renouncement of the cardinalate.

Disputed cases

Cardinals who served as administrators or prelates of the external churches (until 13th century)

Rejected episcopal elections of the cardinals in 13th century

References

Bibliography 

 

 

 

 

 

 

 

 

 

 

 

 

 

 

 
 

 

^